Milford is a surname and a masculine given name. People with the name include:

Surname 
 Anthony Milford (born 1994), Australian rugby league footballer
 Dale Milford (1926–1997), American politician
 Dan Milford (1876–1950), Welsh trade unionist
 Dick Milford (1895–1987), English clergyman
 Edward Milford (1894–1972), Australian Army officer
 Gene Milford (1902–1991), American film and television editor
 Harold Milford (1914–1944), English army officer
 Henry Milford (1833–1888), Australian politician
 Humphrey Sumner Milford (1877–1952), English publisher at the Oxford University Press 
 Jake Milford (1914–1984), Canadian ice hockey manager
 John Milford (1929–2000), American actor
 Karl Milford (born 1950), Austrian economist and academic
 Kim Milford (1951–1988), American actor, singer, songwriter
 Laloa Milford (born 1976), Samoan rugby union player
 Nancy Milford (1938–2022), American biographer
 Penelope Milford (born 1948), American actress
 Robin Milford (1903–1959), English composer
 Roger Milford, English football referee
 Samuel Milford (1797–1865), English barrister and judge

Given name 
 Milford Beagle Jr., American army officer 
 Milford Burriss (1937–2016), American businessman and politician 
 Milford Graves (1941–2021), American musician
 Milford Hodge (born 1961), American football player
 Milford W. Howard (1862–1937), American politician
 Milford Keresoma (born 1992), New Zealand rugby player 
 Milford C. Kintz (1903–1998), American politician
 Milford H. Wolpoff (born 1942), American paleoanthropologist 
 Milford Zornes (1908–2008), American watercolor artist

Fictional characters 
 Milford Meanswell, a character in the TV series LazyTown
 Milford Cubicle, a character in the animation series Salad Fingers

Masculine given names